Andrew Epperson (born November 24, 1990) is an American long-distance runner. He competed in the men's marathon at the 2019 World Athletics Championships held in Doha, Qatar. He finished in 46th place.

References

External links
 
 

1990 births
Living people
Place of birth missing (living people)
American male long-distance runners
American male marathon runners
World Athletics Championships athletes for the United States
21st-century American people